Murree Road, is a major road that runs from Islamabad and Rawalpindi to Murree in Pakistan. It passes through Rawalpindi's downtown area, and has been a hotspot for various political and social events.

Names 
It was originally named Raza Shah Pehlavi Road in the 1960s, after Mohammad Reza Pahlavi, the last Shah of Iran, who was the first head of state to visit Pakistan. However, it has always been known as Murree Road since it eventually led to the nearby hill station of Murree.

On 20 May 2008, Prime Minister Yousaf Raza Gillani announced that the federal government had decided to rename the road after Benazir Bhutto, who was assassinated at the nearby Liaqat National Bagh on 27 December 2007. However, the city officials claimed that the change of name had not been notified, and was, therefore, not official. In spite of this, residents and shopkeepers started referring it with its new name.

Route 
Nala Lai is located along the road in Rawalpindi. History describes that Nala Lai's water was pure enough to wash clothes, but now it has become polluted with waste water from all sources including factories and houses. Liaquat National Bagh, famous place for political gatherings as well as being the site of the assassinations of two former prime ministers and bystanders, is also located along the Murree Road.

Nine Rawalpindi-Islamabad Metrobus stations also lie along Murree Road.

Gallery

See also
 Lai Expressway

References

External links
Murree Road Pictures and Videos

Populated places in Rawalpindi District
Murree
Roads in Islamabad Capital Territory
Highways in Punjab